Stadniki may refer to the following places:
Stadniki, Lesser Poland Voivodeship (south Poland)
Stadniki, Podlaskie Voivodeship (north-east Poland)
Stadniki, Warmian-Masurian Voivodeship (north Poland)